Yevhen Vasylyovych Shapoval (born 16 August 1987) is a Ukrainian football defender playing for Ukrainian First League club Arsenal Bila Tserkva.

Club history
Yevhen Shapoval began his football career in Metalist Youth in Kharkiv. He transferred to FC Kremin Kremenchuk during 2009 summer transfer window.

Career statistics

References

External links
  Profile – Official Kremin site
  FC Kremin Kremenchuk Squad on the PFL website
 

1987 births
Living people
FC Kremin Kremenchuk players
FC Arsenal-Kyivshchyna Bila Tserkva players
Ukrainian footballers
Association football defenders
Footballers from Kharkiv